The first series of Ex on the Beach Italy, an Italian television programme, began airing on 26 September 2018 on MTV Italy. The show was announced on July 16, 2018, and premiered on MTV Italy on September 26 of the same year. The official list of cast members, confirmed with a picture posted on social media, includes four single boys and four single girls. Elettra Lamborghini was introduced as hostess. The filming location was held on the coast of Thailand, in Pattaya.

Cast 

 Bold indicates original cast member; all other cast were brought into the series as an ex.

Duration of cast 

 Table Key
 Key:  = "Cast member" is featured in this episode
 Key:  = "Cast member" arrives on the beach
 Key:  = "Cast member" has an ex arrive on the beach
 Key:  = "Cast member" arrives on the beach and has an ex arrive during the same episode
 Key:  = "Cast member" leaves the beach
 Key:  = "Cast member" does not feature in this episode

Episodes

References

External links 

 Official website

2018 Italian television seasons
01